FC Rochyn Sosnivka is an amateur club from Sosnivka (a suburb of Chervonohrad) competing in the regional competitions of Lviv Oblast and Ukrainian amateur competitions.

History
The club originally was founded in 1964 as FC Shakhtar Sosnivka and later couple of times carried the name of Rochyn. In 2003, FC Rochyn Sosnivka merged with former professional FC Shakhtar Chervonohrad (1957–2014).

In 2004, the club was revived as FC Nadiya Sosnivka and in 2006 changed its name to FC Hirnyk Sosnivka.

The club is a winner of the 2015 Ukrainian Amateur Cup.

In 2017, the club returned its old name of FC Rochyn Sosnivka.

Honours
Ukrainian Amateur Cup
 Winners (1): 2015

Football championship of Lviv Oblast
 Winners (2): 2000, 2001
 Runners-up (4): 1998–99, 2014, 2016, 2017

Football cup of Lviv Oblast
 Winners (1): 1998–99
 Runners-up (2): 2014, 2016

External links
 Official website
 Rochyn Sosnivka at AAFU
 Valerko, A. "Rochyn" (Sosnivka): preparing to new feats («Рочин» (Соснівка): готуючись до нових звершень). AAFU. 27 July 2018.

 
Rochyn Sosnivka
Rochyn Sosnivka
Association football clubs established in 1964
1964 establishments in Ukraine